The 2017 Super Rugby Final was played between the  and the . The match, held at Ellis Park in Johannesburg was the 22nd final in the Super Rugby competition's history, and attracted a record crowd attendance of 62,000.

The Crusaders won the final, defeating the Lions by eight points, and stretched their record number of Super Rugby title wins to eight. A strong Crusaders defence, several errors committed by the Lions and a red card were the losers' downfall in the highly anticipated Super Rugby final held on South African soil for the first time since 2010.

Both finalists had won their respective conferences in the regular season. The Lions, as the top-placed team in 2017 season standings, played all their matches in the finals series at home in Johannesburg.

Road to the final

The 18 teams were split geographically into two groups with two conferences in each group. The Australasian Group included five teams in the Australian Conference and five teams in the New Zealand Conference. The South African Group, with six South African teams, one Argentinean team and one Japanese team was split into a four-team Africa 1 Conference and a four-team Africa 2 Conference.

The four conference winners qualified for the quarterfinals with a home ground advantage against four wildcard teams, made up of the third to fifth placed teams in the Australasian Group and the third placed team in the South African Group.

The quarterfinals featured away wins for the Hurricanes over the Brumbies, and Chiefs over the Stormers. The Crusaders beat Highlanders, keeping them scoreless, and the Lions beat the Sharks. For the semifinals, the Crusaders defeated the Chiefs in Christchurch and the Lions defeated the Hurricanes in Johannesburg.

The play-off fixtures were as follows:

Quarter-finals

Semi-finals

Final

Summary

Details

References

Final
2017
2017 in New Zealand rugby union
2017 in South African rugby union
Crusaders (rugby union) matches
Lions (United Rugby Championship) matches
Sports competitions in Johannesburg